The French legislative elections took place on 12 and 19 March 1978 to elect the sixth National Assembly of the Fifth Republic.

On 2 April 1974, President Georges Pompidou died. The non-Gaullist center-right leader Valéry Giscard d'Estaing was elected to succeed him. Because the Gaullist UDR was the largest party in the pro-Giscard majority in the Assembly, Giscard chose Jacques Chirac to lead the cabinet. This period was one of renovation for Gaullism.

The presidential will to "govern towards the center" and to promote a "modern liberal society" disconcerted the Gaullist party. The Abortion Act and the reduction of the age of majority to 18 years worried a part of the conservative electorate. Furthermore, a personal conflict opposed the two heads of the executive. In August 1976, Chirac resigned because he considered that he "(had) not the means to carry on (his) function of Prime Minister".

Three months later, the UDR was replaced by the Rally for the Republic (Rassemblement pour la République or RPR). This, Chirac's electoral machine, was officially a member of the Presidential Majority, but frequently criticized the liberal and pro-European policy of President Giscard d'Estaing and his new Prime minister Raymond Barre. The executive duo reacted by federating the non-Gaullist center-right in the Union for French Democracy (Union pour la démocratie française or UDF).

While the right-wing majority was divided, and the economic situation deteriorated, the "Union of Left" won the mid-term local elections. According to the polls, it was favourite to win the legislative election. In his Verdun-sur-le-Doubs speech, President Giscard d'Estaing warned the French voters that he could not prevent the enforcement of the left-wing Common programme if the "Union of Left" won. However, Socialists and Communists did not update their Common programme due to increasing tension between the two parties resulting from the PS gaining in electoral success at the PCF's expense.

Contrary to what polls indicated, the Presidential Majority won but it obtained only 2,284 votes more than the "Union of Left". For the first time since 1936, the Socialists obtained more votes than the Communists. Furthermore, the French electorate appeared evenly shared between four equivalent political parties (RPR, UDF, PS, PCF). Raymond Barre was confirmed as Prime Minister. Until the 2007 French legislative election, it was the last time that either the right or the left had won back-to-back legislative elections.

Results 

|-
! style="background-color:#E9E9E9;text-align:left;vertical-align:top;" rowspan=2 colspan=3 width=600 |Parties and coalitions
! style="background-color:#E9E9E9;text-align:center;" colspan=2 |1st round
! style="background-color:#E9E9E9;text-align:center;" colspan=2 |2nd round
! style="background-color:#E9E9E9" rowspan=2|Total seats
|-
! style="background-color:#E9E9E9;text-align:right;" |Votes
! style="background-color:#E9E9E9;text-align:right;" |%
! style="background-color:#E9E9E9;text-align:right;" |Votes
! style="background-color:#E9E9E9;text-align:right;" |%
|-
|style="background-color:#0000C8"|
| style="text-align:left;" | Rally for the Republic (Rassemblement pour la République)
| style="text-align:right;" | RPR
| style="text-align:right;" | 6,462,462
| style="text-align:right;" | 22.62
| style="text-align:right;" | 6,651,756
| style="text-align:right;" | 26.11
| style="text-align:right;" | 150
|-
|style="background-color:#00CCCC"|
| style="text-align:left;" | Union for French Democracy (Union pour la démocratie française)
| style="text-align:right;" | UDF
| style="text-align:right;" | 6,128,849 
| style="text-align:right;" | 21.45
| style="text-align:right;" | 5,907,603 
| style="text-align:right;" | 23.18
| style="text-align:right;" | 121
|-
|style="background-color:#4C4CB0"|
| style="text-align:left;" | Presidential Majority (Majorité présidentielle)
| style="text-align:right;" | MAJ
| style="text-align:right;" | 684,985
| style="text-align:right;" | 2.39
| style="text-align:right;" | 305,763
| style="text-align:right;" | 1.20
| style="text-align:right;" | 16
|- style="background-color:lightblue"
|style="text-align:left;" colspan=2| Total "Presidential Majority" (Right)
|
| style="text-align:right;" | 13,276,296 
| style="text-align:right;" | 46.46
| style="text-align:right;" | 12,865,122 
| style="text-align:right;" | 50.49
| style="text-align:right;" | 287
|-
|style="background-color:#E75480"|
| style="text-align:left;" | Socialist Party (Parti socialiste)
| style="text-align:right;" | PS
| style="text-align:right;" | 6,451,151
| style="text-align:right;" | 22.58
| style="text-align:right;" | 7,212,916
| style="text-align:right;" | 28.31
| style="text-align:right;" | 104
|-
|style="background-color:#FF0000"|
| style="text-align:left;" | French Communist Party (Parti communiste français)
| style="text-align:right;" | PCF
| style="text-align:right;" | 5,870,402
| style="text-align:right;" | 20.55
| style="text-align:right;" | 4,744,868
| style="text-align:right;" | 18.62
| style="text-align:right;" | 86
|-
|style="background-color:#FFBF00"|
| style="text-align:left;" | Movement of Left Radicals (Mouvement des radicaux de gauche)
| style="text-align:right;" | MRG
| style="text-align:right;" | 603,932
| style="text-align:right;" | 2.11
| style="text-align:right;" | 595,478
| style="text-align:right;" | 2.36
| style="text-align:right;" | 10
|- style="background-color:pink"
|style="text-align:left;" colspan=2|  Total "Union of Left"
|
| style="text-align:right;" | 12,925,485
| style="text-align:right;" | 45.24
| style="text-align:right;" | 12,553,262
| style="text-align:right;" | 49.24
| style="text-align:right;" | 200
|-
|style="background-color:gray"|
| style="text-align:left;" | Miscellaneous including the Unified Socialist Party (Parti socialiste unifié)
|
| style="text-align:right;" | 793,274
| style="text-align:right;" | 2.77
| style="text-align:right;" | 57,418
| style="text-align:right;" | 0.22
| style="text-align:right;" | 1 PSU
|-
|style="background-color:#77ff77"|
| style="text-align:left;" | Ecologists
| style="text-align:right;" | ECO
| style="text-align:right;" | 621,100
| style="text-align:right;" | 2.14
| style="text-align:right;" | -
| style="text-align:right;" | -
| style="text-align:right;" | -
|-
|style="background-color:#960018"|
| style="text-align:left;" | Far-Left
|
| style="text-align:right;" | 953,088
| style="text-align:right;" | 3.33
| style="text-align:right;" | -
| style="text-align:right;" | -
| style="text-align:right;" | -
|-
|
| style="text-align:left;" | Total
|
| style="text-align:right;" | 28,560,243
| style="text-align:right;" | 100
| style="text-align:right;" | 25,475,802
| style="text-align:right;" | 100
| style="text-align:right;" | 488
|-
| style="text-align:left;" colspan=8 | Abstention: 17.22% (1st round); 15.34% (2nd round)
|}

National Assembly by Parliamentary Group

References

External links
Map of Deputies elected in 1978 according to their group in the House, including overseas (in french)

1978
1978 elections in France